Universidad del Cine (FUC; English: "University of Cinema/Film") is a private not-for-profit university located in the neighbourhood of San Telmo in Buenos Aires, Argentina. It was founded in 1991 by Manuel Antin, who currently serves as Rector. The school offers undergraduate, graduate and post graduate programmes focused in film and media arts.

About the Universidad del Cine 
Since its creation, Universidad del Cine proposed to itself three ambitious goals: to generate a space of creation which could make easier the appearance and realization of new projects; to give hierarchy to cinematographic education, inserting it in the framework of an integral and humanistic education; and become into a production center to deepen its educational action and make possible the insertion of its students in the professional field. Established in San Telmo, the historical quarter of Buenos Aires, we spread, from our beginning, a constant activity that gave urge to the Argentinean cinema.

Schools and studies

School of Cinematography (Facultad de Cinematografía) 
 Degree programs: 
 Directing (Dirección de Cinematografía) 
 Screenwriting (Guión Cinematográfico) 
 Lighting and Camera (Iluminación y Cámara Cinematográficas) 
 Scenography and Costume (Escenografía y Vestuario Cinematográficos) 
 Film Editing (Compaginación Cinematográfica) 
 Producing (Producción Cinematográfica) 
 History, Theory and Film Criticism (Historia, Teoría y Crítica Cinematográficas) 
 Animation and Multimedia (Cine de Animación y Multimedia)
 Post Degree programs:
 Master in documentary filmmaking (Maestría encine documental)

School of Communication (Facultad de Comunicación) 
 Degree programs: 
 Visual Arts (Artes Visuales)
 Graphic Design (Diseño Gráfico)
 Educational Processes (Procesos Educativos)

Film Production 

Each year the Universidad del Cine produces more than 150 short films, documentaries and web series.
From 1996 to 2008 produced six feature films directed by students:

Moebius (1996)
Bad Times (1998)
Just for Today 2000)
Mercano the Marcian (2002)
Vespers (2006)
Gost of Buenos Aires (2008)

After 2008 the Universidad del Cine gives support to students for the production of theirs own features films.

Infrastructure and resources 
The Universidad del Cine is equipped for the production and post production of image and sound in professional video formats, S16mm and 35mm film. It stands out the Laboratory for the process of 16mm. color negative film. This is the only 16mm. non-profit laboratory in Latin America. Its work  is oriented to academic and experimental productions. The Universidad del Cine has two filming sets, traditional and digital animation workshops and an auditorium and screening room. Its Library and Video Library is specialized in audiovisual arts, focusing on Argentine cinema. It has about 12,000 bibliographic items and 7,000 video titles.

Student interchange agreements 

The Universidad del Cine celebrated student interchange agreements with other film schools:

SPAIN
UNIVERSIDAD POMPEU FABRA http://www.upf.edu
UNIVERSIDAD DE LEÓN http://www.unileon.es
ESCOLA DE CINEMA & AUDIOVISUALS DE CATALUNYA centro adscrito a la UB (Universitat de Barcelona) https://web.archive.org/web/20171029142305/http://www.escac.es/

FRANCE
ESCUELA NACIONAL DE ARTE DE PARIS – CERGY (ENSAPC) http://www.ensapc.fr/
LA FEMIS (École Nationale Supérieure des métiers de l’image et du son) http://www.femis.fr

UNITED KINGDOM
UNIVERSITY OF EDINBURGH http://www.ed.ac.uk

SWITZERLAND
ZÜRCHER HOCHSCHULE DER KÜNSTE (Zurich University of the Arts- ZHdK) https://www.zhdk.ch
HEAD HAUTE ÉCOLE D´ART ET DE DESIGN http://www.hesge.ch

CZECH REPUBLIC
FAMU http://international.famu.cz/

PORTUGAL
ESCOLA SUPERIOR DE TEATRO E CINEMA – ESTC https://www.estc.ipl.pt

GERMANY
FILMAKADEMIE BADEN - WÜRTTEMBERG http://www.filmakademie.de/en
FILM UNIVERSITY BABELSBERG KONRAD WOLF (Hochschule für Film und Fernsehen "Konrad Wolf") – Potsdam http://www.filmuniversitaet.de
HOCHSCHULE FÜR FERNSEHEN UND FILM MÜNCHEN (HFF Munich)

KOREA
KOREA NATIONAL UNIVERSITY OF ARTS (K-Arts) http://www.karts.ac.kr

FINLAND
AALTO UNIVERSITY SCHOOL OF ARTS, DESIGN AND ARCHITECTURE http://www.aalto.fi

BELGIUM
LUCA School of Arts http://www.luca-arts.be

Authorities of the Universidad del Cine 

Rector: Manuel Antin
Vice Rector: Arq. Mario A. Santos
Academic Secretary: Prof. Graciela Fernández Toledo
Head of International Affairs: Arq. María Marta Antin
Technical Secretary: Lic. Blanca Carballo

References

External links 
 www.ucine.edu.ar

Education in Buenos Aires
Universities in Buenos Aires Province
Private universities in Argentina
Educational institutions established in 1991
1991 establishments in Argentina